Allogny is a commune in the Cher department of the Centre-Val de Loire region of France.

Geography

Population

Sights
 The church of St.Sulpice, dating from the thirteenth century.
 The seventeenth century manorhouse at Beauchêne.
 A feudal motte.
 The war memorial.

See also
Communes of the Cher department

References

External links

Link to a photo of the war memorial

Communes of Cher (department)